Dryad is a rural unincorporated community in Lewis County, Washington. The town of Doty is 1.3-miles to the west, with Adna and Ceres to the east, on Washington State Route 6. The Chehalis River bisects the area.

Etymology
The community was formerly known as Salal. The name Dryad was supplied by Northern Pacific Railway officials around 1890 at the suggestion of Willam C. Albee, who was superintendent of the Pacific Division of the NP. In mythology, a dryad was a wood nymph. Albee figured that a dryad might find itself right at home living in the local fir and cedar trees.

History
Dryad is one of many former lumber towns that sprang up on the Willapa Harbor Line (Chehalis, Washington to South Bend, Washington) of the Northern Pacific Railway. The town was originally located two miles south of the present location. The community moved when the Leudinghaus brothers of Chehalis built a sawmill at the present site in 1902.

The Dryad Community Baptist Church was built in 1903 and has remained open since its construction. Renovations in 2006 were done to the bell tower and roof, with stained glass windows installed in 2018.

Climate
This region experiences warm (but not hot) and dry summers, with no average monthly temperatures above 71.6 °F.  According to the Köppen Climate Classification system, Dryad has a warm-summer Mediterranean climate, abbreviated "Csb" on climate maps.

Parks and Recreation

The annual Pe Ell River Run passes through Dryad. Held since 1978, the event consists of entrants buying or building water crafts and floating down the Chehalis River from Pe Ell to Rainbow Falls State Park, which is one mile due east of the town. Riders can float over a slight waterfall that still remains despite severe flooding damage due to the Great Coastal Gale of 2007.

The Willapa Hills Trail passes through the town.

Government and politics

Politics

Dryad is recognized as heavily favoring the Republican Party  and Conservatism. 

The results for the 2020 U.S. Presidential Election for the Dryad voting district were as follows:

 Donald J. Trump (Republican) - 178 (75.42%)
 Joe Biden (Democrat) - 54 (22.88%)
 Jo Jorgensen (Libertarian) - 2 (0.85%)
 Howie Hawkins (Green) - 1 (0.42%)
 Write-in candidate - 1 (0.42%)

References

Populated places in Lewis County, Washington
Unincorporated communities in Lewis County, Washington
Unincorporated communities in Washington (state)